Peyman Jalali Abadi was an Iranian stuntman actor . He started his career in Germany, particularly in the TV series Alarm für Cobra 11 – Die Autobahnpolizei. He later returned to Iran and worked in various movies and TV series, including Rahe Bipayan, Hoosh-e Siah, and Rooz-e Hasrat.

He died in 2009 in an accident during the filming of the movie Invisible Eyes, when a bus he was supposed to jump out of overturned, rolled down a slope and went into flames.

Partial filmography
Television
Alarm für Cobra 11 – Die Autobahnpolizei
Hoosh-e Siah
Rahe Bipayan

Notes and references

External links

 

1972 births
2009 deaths
Iranian male film actors
Iranian stunt performers
Accidental deaths in Iran
Burials at artist's block of Behesht-e Zahra